Maggie is an American comedy television series starring Ann Cusack. The series premiered August 18, 1998, on Lifetime Television, running for one season and airing its final episode on March 13, 1999.

Premise
Maggie Day and Dr. Arthur Day have been married for 19 years, and together they have a 17-year-old daughter, Amanda. Amanda's friend Reg is a budding cartoonist. After Maggie gets a job at an animal clinic and develops a crush on the veterinarian, Richard, she starts seeing a therapist, Kimberly.

Cast

Main
 Ann Cusack as Maggie Day
 John Getz as Dr. Arthur Day
 Melissa Samuels as Amy Sherwood
 Morgan Nagler as Amanda Day
 John Slattery as Richard

Recurring
 Todd Giebenhain as Reg
 Francesca P. Roberts as Kimberly

Production
The working title for the series was Maggie Day. In November 1998, series creator, writer and executive producer Dan O'Shannon left the series with the episode "Love the One You're Not With", due to creative differences with Lifetime Television.

Episodes

References

External links

Lifetime (TV network) original programming
Television series by CBS Studios
1990s American sitcoms
1998 American television series debuts
1999 American television series endings
Television shows set in Portland, Oregon